Army Public School, Narangi, was established in 1982. It is an Indian Army Public School in the Army Cantonment of Narangi in Guwahati, Assam, India.

References

Indian Army Public Schools
Schools in Guwahati
1982 establishments in Assam
Educational institutions established in 1982